Copamyntis infusella is a species of snout moth in the genus Copamyntis. It is found in Australia, India and Sri Lanka.

This species is a pest on cotton.

An associated Chalcididae to this species is Brachymeria rufescens.

References

Moths described in 1879
Phycitini